Weis Earth Science Museum (abbreviated as WESM), located at 1478 Midway Rd, on the University of Wisconsin–Oshkosh, Fox Cities Campus in Menasha, Wisconsin, USA, was opened in 2002. It focuses on Wisconsin geology and its mining history. As such, it was designated as the Official Mineralogical Museum of Wisconsin by then-Governor Tommy Thompson in 2000, prior to its construction.

Description and history
The museum is organized as theme galleries, interactive displays, and temporary exhibits, as well as research collections and office space. It holds some 10,000 specimens, of which about 1,000 are on display at any given time. Museum staff actively engages in public outreach through school tours. Plans are also being made for visiting schools and for creating digital, virtual fieldtrips. The collections, currently being cataloged in online databases, focus on the following themes as they pertain to Wisconsin and surrounding areas: Minerals, Fossils, Rocks, Sedimentary structures, Geology, Archaeology, Mining, Geologists, Geological sites, Mining history, and History of geological/archaeological studies.

The galleries are currently laid out as: Space Rocks (meteors and meteorites), Introduction to the Earth, Wisconsin Through Time, Wisconsin Industry, Water (Water Everywhere), Animals Through Time featuring the Bruce Danz Collection, and the Barlow Gallery of Minerals.

Curators and staff engage in a wide range of research topics in geology and paleontology, and they have written many scientific papers and books.

The WESM is named for Leonard and Donna Weis, who provided the founding financial gift to establish the museum and to endow the director’s position. Exhibits were designed by founding director Dr. Joanne Kluessendorf in conjunction with Derse Museum Group, Milwaukee. After the passing of Dr. Kluessendorf in 2018, Scott Mikulic was named interim director. In July 2019, Dr. Joseph A. Frederickson was hired as the new permanent director. Dr. Donald G. Mikulic has been a volunteer curator since the WESM’s inception.

Gallery

References

External links 
 

Mineralogy museums
Institutions accredited by the American Alliance of Museums
Museums established in 2002
Paleontology in Wisconsin
Fossil museums
Geology museums
Geology museums in the United States
University museums in Wisconsin